I'm Gonna Make You Mine may refer to:

 I'm Gonna Make You Mine (Lou Christie song), 1969
 I'm Gonna Make You Mine (Tanya Blount song), 1994